The men's snowboard cross competition of the FIS Snowboarding World Championships 2011 was held at Alabaus in La Molina, Spain between January 17 and 18, 2011. 69 athletes from 27 countries competed.

The qualification round was completed on January 17, while the elimination round was completed on January 18.

Results

Qualification

Elimination round

1/8 round
The top 32 qualifiers advanced to the 1/8 round. From here, they participated in four-person elimination races, with the top two from each race advancing. 

Heat 1

Heat 2

Heat 3

Heat 4

Heat 5

Heat 6

Heat 7

Heat 8

1/4 Round

Heat 1

Heat 2

Heat 3

Heat 4

1/2 Round

Heat 1

Heat 2

Final round

Small Final

Final

References

Snowboard cross, men's